Harrison King is an English professional footballer who plays as a midfielder for  club Exeter City.

Career
King made his senior debut for Exeter City on 4 October 2022, in a 2–1 win over Southampton U21 at St James Park in the group stages of the EFL Trophy. On 22 September 2022, he joined Southern League Premier Division South side Plymouth Parkway on a one-month loan, alongside fellow teammate Pedro Borges.

Career statistics

References

Living people
English footballers
Association football midfielders
Exeter City F.C. players
Plymouth Parkway F.C. players
Southern Football League players
Year of birth missing (living people)